The 1980 Pacific typhoon season has no official bounds; it ran year-round in 1980, but most tropical cyclones tend to form in the northwestern Pacific Ocean between June and December. These dates conventionally delimit the period of each year when most tropical cyclones form in the northwestern Pacific Ocean. Tropical storms which formed in the entire west Pacific basin were assigned a name by the Joint Typhoon Warning Center. Tropical depressions that enter or form in the Philippine area of responsibility are assigned a name by the Philippine Atmospheric, Geophysical and Astronomical Services Administration or PAGASA. This can often result in the same storm having two names.

A total of 28 tropical depressions formed this year in the Western Pacific, of which 24 became tropical storms. Beginning in March, tropical cyclones formed in each subsequent month through December. Of the 28, 15 storms reached typhoon intensity, of which 2 reached super typhoon strength. Seven tropical cyclones moved through the Philippines this season.

Seasonal summary 

A total of 28 tropical depressions formed this year in the Western Pacific, of which 24 became tropical storms. Of the 28, 15 storms reached typhoon intensity, of which 2 reached super typhoon strength. Seven tropical cyclones moved through the Philippines this season.

Systems

Tropical Depression Asiang

Tropical Depression 01W (Biring) 

1W hit the Philippines in March.

Severe Tropical Storm Carmen 

On April 4, a tropical depression formed just east of the International Date Line. At the time, the Joint Typhoon Warning Center (JTWC) designated it tropical depression 02W. As it moved generally northwestwards, it strengthened into a tropical storm just before crossing the dateline, but only received a name in the northwest Pacific, being designated Carmen. The JTWC subsequently relinquished responsibility to the Central Pacific Hurricane Center. Carmen lost its initial motion and stalled in the area, ultimately weakening in to a tropical depression on April 8. The depression dissipated the following day and the remnant low returned to western Pacific.

Tropical Depression Konsing

Typhoon Dom (Ditang) 

Dom brushed the Philippines.

Typhoon Ellen 

Ellen had no effect on land.

Severe Tropical Storm Forrest (Gloring) 

Forrest hit the Philippines.

Severe Tropical Storm Georgia (Edeng) 

Georgia threatened Hong Kong.

Severe Tropical Storm Herbert (Huaning) 

Herbert also threatened Hong Kong, and made landfall in Hainan and later in mainland China.

Tropical Depression Isang 

Isang made landfall in the Philippines on June 30 and moved into the South China Sea before dissipating two days later on July 2.

Typhoon Ida (Lusing) 

Ida passed south of Taiwan and moved ashore in China just north of Hong Kong.

Typhoon Joe (Nitang) 

Typhoon Joe, which developed on July 16 from the near equatorial trough, hit eastern Luzon on the 20th. It weakened over island, but restrengthened in the South China Sea to a 100 mph typhoon before making landfall on Hainan Island on the 22nd. Joe made its final landfall that night on northern Vietnam before dissipating on the 23rd. Joe caused heavy damage and an estimated 19 deaths in the Philippines with many more in Vietnam. The exact numbers are unknown due to Typhoon Kim hitting just four days later.

Tropical Depression 10W (Maring) 

10W threatened the Philippines.

Typhoon Kim (Osang) 

Like Typhoon Joe, Kim formed from the near equatorial monsoon trough on July 19. It tracked quickly westward-northwest underneath a subtropical ridge, reaching tropical storm strength on the July 21 and typhoon strength on July 23. After developing an eye, Kim began to rapidly intensify, and during the afternoon of July 24, peaked in intensity as a super typhoon. Several hours later, Kim made landfall over the Philippines, but the storm had weakened considerably by this time. Throughout the Philippines, 40 people were killed, two via drownings, and 19,000 others were directly affected. A total of 12,000 homes were destroyed and 5,000 villages received flooded. Less than a week earlier, the same areas were affected by Joe; however, Kim was considered the more damaging of the two typhoons. Land interaction took toll on Kim, and upon entering the South China Sea, was down below typhoon intensity. Kim continued northwestward, but with its disrupted circulation, it remained a tropical storm until hitting southern China July 27 to the northeast of Hong Kong, where damage was minor. Later that day, Kim dissipated.

Typhoon Lex 

Lex stayed at sea.

Typhoon Marge 

Marge stayed at sea.

Tropical Depression 14W (Paring) 

14W was short-lived.

Typhoon Norris (Reming) 

Norris hit Taiwan.

Typhoon Orchid (Toyang) 

The monsoon trough spawned a tropical depression on September 1. It tracked northwestward, remaining disorganized and dissipating on the 5th. Another tropical depression developed to the east of the old circulation, quickly becoming the primary circulation and intensifying to a tropical storm on the 6th. With generally weak steering currents, Orchid looped three times on its track, strengthening to a typhoon on the 9th and reaching a peak of 95 mph winds on the 10th. Early on the 11th the storm hit southwestern Japan, and became extratropical that day over the Japan Sea. Orchid caused considerable damage from high winds and rain, resulting in at least nine casualties with 112 missing. It was also responsible for the September 10th loss of the MV Derbyshire, a large 91,655 ton bulk carrier which sank on 9 September with all 44 hands on board due to very rough seas. It remains the largest British flagged ship to be lost at sea.

Typhoon Percy (Undang) 
 Typhoon Percy struck southern Taiwan on September 18. A day later, with its circulation and low-level inflow greatly disrupted, 50 mph Tropical Storm Percy hit southeastern China, and dissipated later that night. 7 people died in the storm, with moderate damage on its path.

Severe Tropical Storm Ruth 

A monsoon depression transitioned into a tropical depression on September 13 in the South China Sea. It initially moved southward, then turned to the west-northwest, reaching tropical storm strength late on the 13th. Ruth crossed Hainan Island on the 14th and 15th, becoming a typhoon late on the 15th before hitting northern Vietnam on the 16th. The typhoon left nearly half a million homeless, with 106 known dead or missing in Vietnam.

Typhoon Sperry 

Sperry did not affect land.

Severe Tropical Storm Thelma 

Thelma stayed at sea as a tropical storm.

Typhoon Vernon 

Vernon was a potent typhoon that stayed from land.

Typhoon Wynne (Welpring) 
 Wynne was the strongest storm of the season, reaching a peak of  winds and a pressure of 890 mbar. As a strengthening category 1 storm, it rapidly intensified to become the strongest storm of the season, deepening 85 mb from 975 mb to 890 mb in 23 hours 56 minutes between 0240 UTC October 8 and 0236 UTC October 9, 1980. It caused 6 power outages in Japan, and 10 deaths.

Tropical Storm Alex 

Alex stayed over water.

Typhoon Betty (Aring) 

Betty hit the Philippines as a strong typhoon. Betty killed 101 people in the Philippines.

Tropical Storm Cary (Yoning) 

Cary moved into the South China Sea.

Tropical Depression Basiang 

Basiang formed in the South China Sea on November 13 before moving erratically and making landfall in Vietnam on November 16 and dissipating on the same day.

Typhoon Dinah 

Dinah hit the Northern Mariana Islands directly. Saipan sustained significant damage.

Tropical Depression Kayang

Tropical Storm Ed (Dorang) 
 A tropical disturbance was first observed near Yap on the 14th of December. The disturbance moved westward at between 12 and 15 kt (22 to 28 km/hr) as its convective activity and overall organization continued to improve. A Tropical Cyclone Formation Alert (TCFA) was issued when a reconnaissance aircraft observed a well-defined low-level circulation with a minimum sea-level pressure of 1004 mb. The disturbance was upgraded to Tropical Storm Ed on December 15. It then became evident from synoptic analyses that Ed was moving into an area which was unfavorable for continued development. Eventually, after most of the storm's convection had been sheared off, Ed's surface center began to track to the southwest under the influence of the strong surface ridge to the north. Dissipation as a tropical cyclone was completed on the 24th as the remnants of Ed moved into northern Mindanao.

Storm names 

During the season 24 named tropical cyclones developed in the Western Pacific and were named by the Joint Typhoon Warning Center, when it was determined that they had become tropical storms. These names were contributed to a revised list which started on 1979.

Philippines 

The Philippine Atmospheric, Geophysical and Astronomical Services Administration uses its own naming scheme for tropical cyclones in their area of responsibility. PAGASA assigns names to tropical depressions that form within their area of responsibility and any tropical cyclone that might move into their area of responsibility. Should the list of names for a given year prove to be insufficient, names are taken from an auxiliary list, the first 6 of which are published each year before the season starts. Names not retired from this list will be used again in the 1984 season. This is the same list used for the 1976 season, with the exception of Ditang, which replaced Didang. PAGASA uses its own naming scheme that starts in the Filipino alphabet, with names of Filipino female names ending with "ng" (A, B, K, D, etc.).

Season effects 
This table will list all the storms that developed in the northwestern Pacific Ocean west of the International Date Line and north of the equator during 1980. It will include their intensity, duration, name, areas affected, deaths, and damage totals. Classification and intensity values will be based on estimations conducted by the JMA, the JTWC, and/or PAGASA. Peak wind speeds are in ten-minute sustained standards unless otherwise noted. All damage figures will be in 1981 USD. Damages and deaths from a storm will include when the storm was a precursor wave or an extratropical low.

|-
| Asiang ||  || bgcolor=#| || bgcolor=#| || bgcolor=#| || Philippines ||  ||  ||
|-
| TD ||  || bgcolor=#| || bgcolor=#| || bgcolor=#| || Caroline Islands, Mariana Islands ||  ||  ||
|-
| 01W (Biring) ||  || bgcolor=#| || bgcolor=#| || bgcolor=#| || Caroline Islands, Philippines ||  ||  ||
|-
| Carmen ||  || bgcolor=#| || bgcolor=#| || bgcolor=#| || Marshall Islands ||  ||  ||
|-
| Konsing ||  || bgcolor=#| || bgcolor=#| || bgcolor=#| || Philippines ||  ||  ||
|-
| Dom (Ditang) ||  || bgcolor=#| || bgcolor=#| || bgcolor=#| || Caroline Islands, Philippines ||  ||  ||
|-
| Ellen ||  || bgcolor=#| || bgcolor=#| || bgcolor=#| || Mariana Islands ||  ||  ||
|-
| Forrest (Gloring) ||  || bgcolor=#| || bgcolor=#| || bgcolor=#| || Caroline Islands, Philippines, Ryukyu Islands ||  ||  ||
|-
| Georgia (Edeng) ||  || bgcolor=#| || bgcolor=#| || bgcolor=#| || China ||  ||  ||
|-
| Herbert (Huaning) ||  || bgcolor=#| || bgcolor=#| || bgcolor=#| || Philippines, South China ||  ||  ||
|-
| Isang ||  || bgcolor=#| || bgcolor=#| || bgcolor=#| || Philippines ||  ||  ||
|-
| TD ||  || bgcolor=#| || bgcolor=#| || bgcolor=#| || Caroline Islands ||  ||  ||
|-
| Ida (Lusing) ||  || bgcolor=#| || bgcolor=#| || bgcolor=#| || Philippines, Taiwan, China || Unknown ||  ||
|-
| 10W (Maring) ||  || bgcolor=#| || bgcolor=#| || bgcolor=#| || Philippines, South China ||  ||  ||
|-
| Joe (Nitang) ||  || bgcolor=#| || bgcolor=#| || bgcolor=#| || Philippines, South China, Vietnam ||  ||  ||
|-
| Kim (Osang) ||  || bgcolor=#| || bgcolor=#| || bgcolor=#| || Philippines, South China, Taiwan || Unknown ||  ||
|-
| Lex ||  || bgcolor=#| || bgcolor=#| || bgcolor=#| || Soviet Union || None || None ||
|-
| Marge ||  || bgcolor=#| || bgcolor=#| || bgcolor=#| || None || None || None ||
|-
| TD ||  || bgcolor=#| || bgcolor=#| || bgcolor=#| || None ||  ||  ||
|-
| 14W (Paring) ||  || bgcolor=#| || bgcolor=#| || bgcolor=#| || Philippines, South China ||  ||  ||
|-
| TD ||  || bgcolor=#| || bgcolor=#| || bgcolor=#| || None ||  ||  ||
|-
| Norris (Reming) ||  || bgcolor=#| || bgcolor=#| || bgcolor=#| || Taiwan, Ryukyu Islands, East China || None || None ||
|-
| TD ||  || bgcolor=#| || bgcolor=#| || bgcolor=#| || Philippines ||  ||  ||
|-
| Seniang ||  || bgcolor=#| || bgcolor=#| || bgcolor=#| || None ||  ||  ||
|-
| Orchid (Toyang) ||  || bgcolor=#| || bgcolor=#| || bgcolor=#| || Japan || Unknown ||  ||
|-
| TD ||  || bgcolor=#| || bgcolor=#| || bgcolor=#| || Vietnam, Laos ||  ||  ||
|-
| Ruth ||  || bgcolor=#| || bgcolor=#| || bgcolor=#| || South China, Vietnam, Laos || Unknown ||  ||
|-
| Percy (Undang) ||  || bgcolor=#| || bgcolor=#| || bgcolor=#| || Philippines, Taiwan, China || Unknown ||  ||
|-
| TD ||  || bgcolor=#| || bgcolor=#| || bgcolor=#| || Vietnam ||  ||  ||
|-
| TD ||  || bgcolor=#| || bgcolor=#| || bgcolor=#| || Mariana Islands ||  ||  ||
|-
| TD ||  || bgcolor=#| || bgcolor=#| || bgcolor=#| || Vietnam ||  ||  ||
|-
| TD ||  || bgcolor=#| || bgcolor=#| || bgcolor=#| || Vietnam ||  ||  ||
|-
| Basiang ||  || bgcolor=#| || bgcolor=#| || bgcolor=#| || Vietnam ||  ||  ||
|-
| Kayang ||  || bgcolor=#| || bgcolor=#| || bgcolor=#| || Mariana Islands ||  ||  ||
|-

See also 

 List of Pacific typhoon seasons
 1980 Pacific hurricane season
 1980 Atlantic hurricane season
 1980 North Indian Ocean cyclone season
 Australian cyclone seasons: 1979–80, 1980–81
 South Pacific cyclone seasons: 1979–80, 1980–81
 South-West Indian Ocean cyclone seasons: 1979–80, 1980–81

References

External links 
 Japan Meteorological Agency
 Joint Typhoon Warning Center .
 China Meteorological Agency
 National Weather Service Guam
 Hong Kong Observatory
 Macau Meteorological Geophysical Services
 Korea Meteorological Agency
 Philippine Atmospheric, Geophysical and Astronomical Services Administration
 Taiwan Central Weather Bureau
 Digital Typhoon – Typhoon Images and Information
 Typhoon2000 Philippine typhoon website

 
1980 WPAC